This is a list of butterflies of Norfolk Island.

Papilionidae

Papilioninae
Graphium macleayanus insulana  (Waterhouse, 1920) 
Papilio aegeus aegeus  Donovan, 1805
Papilio amynthor amphiaraus  (C & R Felder, 1864)

Pieridae

Pierinae
Cepora perimale perimale  (Donovan, 1805) 
Belenois java peristhene  (Boisduval, 1859)

Lycaenidae

Polyommatinae
Lampides boeticus  (Linnaeus, 1767) 
Zizina labradus labradus  (Godart, 1824)

Nymphalidae

Danainae
Tirumala hamata hamata  (Macleay, 1826) 
Danaus petilia  (Stoll, 1790) 
Danaus plexippus plexippus  (Linnaeus, 1758) 
Euploea corinna  (Macleay, 1826)

Satyrinae
Melanitis leda bankia  (Fabricius, 1775)

Nymphalinae
Hypolimnas bolina nerina  (Fabricius, 1775) 
Hypolimnas misippus  (Linnaeus, 1764) 
Junonia villida calybe  (Godart, 1819) 
Cynthia kershawi  McCoy, 1868
Bassaris itea  (Fabricius, 1775)

References
W.John Tennent: A checklist of the butterflies of Melanesia, Micronesia, Polynesia and some adjacent areas. Zootaxa 1178: 1-209 (21 Apr. 2006)

Butterflies
Norfolk Island
Norfolk Island
Norfolk Island
Butterflies of Norfolk Island